Koo Kien Keat  (born 18 September 1985) is a Malaysian former professional badminton player. He succeeded in both men's and mixed doubles but is best known for his partnership with Tan Boon Heong with whom, he reached a career high ranking of world number 1.

Career 
In 2004, he played in the Thomas Cup with Chew Choon Eng. They gave a strong performance during the second doubles match against Flandy Limpele and Eng Hian of Indonesia in the quarter finals. However, after the tournament, the Badminton Association of Malaysia decided to partner him with Chan Chong Ming who previously partnered Choon Eng. Later, they won the bronze medal at the 2005 World Championships.

In 2006, Koo's coach, Rexy Mainaky, decided to paired him with the hard-hitting left-hander Tan Boon Heong. Together, they won the gold medal at the 2006 Doha Asian Games as an unseeded pair. En route to the finals, they defeated several top pairs including Markis Kido and Hendra Setiawan of Indonesia. They are the youngest ever men's doubles pair to win an Asian Games gold medal at the age of 22 and 19 respectively. 2007 was the best year for Koo and Tan. They won several Superseries tournaments and climbed to the top of world rankings. They also won their first All England Superseries title after beating Chinese pair, Cai Yun and Fu Haifeng in straight games.

In 2009, the two won the bronze medal at the 2009 World Championships. At the 2010 BWF World Championships, the pair entered the semifinals after beating Korean rivals Jung Jae-sung and Lee Yong-dae. In the semifinals they defeated China's Guo Zhendong and Xu Chen 21-14, 21-18. Tan and Koo became the first Malaysian pair to enter a World Championship final in 13 years. In the finals, they played China's Cai Yun and Fu Haifeng but lost 21-18, 18-21, 14-21.

In 2010, they won their first title of the year in their home, Malaysia, as the world number 1 pair. They came in seeded number 1 in the All England Open but lost in the first round to Denmark former world champions Lars Paaske and Jonas Rasmussen.

In the 2010 BWF World Championships, they beat the young Chinese pair of Chai Biao and Zhang Nan in the quarter-finals and later their arch rivals, the South Koreans Jung Jae-sung and Lee Yong-dae, in 3 sets to reach the semi-finals. After that, they beat another Chinese pair of Guo Zhendong and Xu Chen to reach their first ever finals in World Championship. The only other Malaysian pair to reach that far before them were Cheah Soon Kit and Yap Kim Hock.

At the 2011 All England Open, Koo and Tan defeated 2008 Olympic champions Markis Kido and Hendra Setiawan in the quarterfinals. They then defeated World champions Cai Yun and Fu Haifeng 21-11, 23-21. They lost to the Danes and then world number 1 Mathias Boe and Carsten Mogensen 21-15, 18-21, 18-21.

In 2012, they competed at the 2012 London Olympics, reaching the semi-finals losing to the eventual gold medalists, and then losing in the bronze medal match to the Koreans. In 2013, they suffered a series of early round exits in 2013 and a three-year major title drought but managed to remain in the top 10 of the world rankings. In 2014, Koo parted with the Badminton Association of Malaysia and became a coach for the Granular Club of Thailand in early 2014. In August that year, Koo returned to play his last tournament with Tan at the 2014 BWF World Championships in Copenhagen, Denmark. Their supposedly last match together was in the third round where they lost to a Chinese Taipei pair with a score of 19-21 in the deciding game.

In 2015, Koo announced that he is coming out of retirement to qualify for the 2016 Rio Olympics with Tan before they call it quits for good. They were sponsored by Seri Mutiara Development Sdn Bhd and playing for an independent club. They achieved several breakthroughs this year, winning the Dutch Open and finishing as runners-up at the Thailand Open. They also made it to two Superseries quarterfinals in Australia and Korea.

In 2016, Koo and Tan managed to enter the top 15 of the world rankings. However, due to the new Olympic qualification requirement set by the BWF whereby each country can send two representatives for each event only if they are both in the top 8 of the world rankings in their discipline and if they are not then only the highest ranked representative will contest, Koo and Tan narrowly failed to qualify for the Olympics. By the time the qualification period had ended, the two were ranked world number 14, just one rank behind compatriots Goh V Shem and Tan Wee Kiong who were selected instead and went on to win the silver medal. In November, Koo re-announced his retirement from professional badminton, citing the Hong Kong Open as his last tournament.

Personal life 
Koo began his studies at St. Michael's Institution in Ipoh, Perak. Later, he received an offer to go to Bukit Jalil Sports School, where he completed his secondary school studies and sat for the SPM (Sijil Pelajaran Malaysia) examination. He married Audrey Tan Su Ven in 2013, and has a son, Dayson, who was born in 2014.

Playing style 
Koo moves very fast around the net areas and is adventurous with deceptive shots. He also reacts very well on fast flat exchanges. A favourite formation is when he is on the front court and his partner, the main smasher, attacks from the rear of the court with powerful, left-handed smashes.

Koo and Tan are an explosive and dynamic pair in their game style.

Achievements

BWF World Championships 
Men's doubles

Mixed doubles

Commonwealth Games 
Men's doubles

Mixed doubles

Asian Games 
Men's doubles

Asian Championships 
Men's doubles

Southeast Asian Games 
Men's doubles

Mixed doubles

World Junior Championships 
Boys' doubles

Asian Junior Championships 
Boys' doubles

Mixed doubles

BWF Superseries 
The BWF Superseries, which was launched on 14 December 2006 and implemented in 2007, is a series of elite badminton tournaments, sanctioned by the Badminton World Federation (BWF). BWF Superseries levels are Superseries and Superseries Premier. A season of Superseries consists of twelve tournaments around the world that have been introduced since 2011. Successful players are invited to the Superseries Finals, which are held at the end of each year.

Men's doubles

  BWF Superseries Finals tournament
  BWF Superseries Premier tournament
  BWF Superseries tournament

BWF Grand Prix 
The BWF Grand Prix had two levels, the BWF Grand Prix and Grand Prix Gold. It was a series of badminton tournaments sanctioned by the Badminton World Federation (BWF) which was held from 2007 to 2017. The World Badminton Grand Prix has been sanctioned by the International Badminton Federation from 1983 to 2006.

Men's doubles

Mixed doubles

  BWF Grand Prix Gold tournament
  BWF & IBF Grand Prix tournament

BWF International Challenge/Series 
Men's doubles

  BWF International Challenge tournament
  BWF International Series tournament

Honours

Honours of Malaysia 
  :
  Member of the Order of the Defender of the Realm (A.M.N.) (2006)

References

External links 

 Profile at Badminton Association of Malaysia
 

1985 births
Living people
People from Ipoh
Malaysian people of Hokkien descent
Malaysian people of Chinese descent
Malaysian sportspeople of Chinese descent
Malaysian male badminton players
Badminton players at the 2008 Summer Olympics
Badminton players at the 2012 Summer Olympics
Olympic badminton players of Malaysia
Badminton players at the 2006 Commonwealth Games
Badminton players at the 2010 Commonwealth Games
Commonwealth Games gold medallists for Malaysia
Commonwealth Games medallists in badminton
Badminton players at the 2006 Asian Games
Badminton players at the 2010 Asian Games
Asian Games gold medalists for Malaysia
Asian Games silver medalists for Malaysia
Asian Games bronze medalists for Malaysia
Asian Games medalists in badminton
Medalists at the 2006 Asian Games
Medalists at the 2010 Asian Games
Competitors at the 2005 Southeast Asian Games
Competitors at the 2009 Southeast Asian Games
Southeast Asian Games gold medalists for Malaysia
Southeast Asian Games silver medalists for Malaysia
Southeast Asian Games bronze medalists for Malaysia
Southeast Asian Games medalists in badminton
World No. 1 badminton players
Members of the Order of the Defender of the Realm
Medallists at the 2006 Commonwealth Games
Medallists at the 2010 Commonwealth Games